A Munchkin is a native of the fictional Munchkin Country in the Oz books by American author L. Frank Baum. They first appear in the classic children's novel The Wonderful Wizard of Oz (1900) where they welcome Dorothy Gale to their city in Oz. The Munchkins are described as being the same height as Dorothy and they wear only shades of blue clothing, as blue is the Munchkins' favorite color. Blue is also the predominating color that officially represents the eastern quadrant in the Land of Oz. The Munchkins have appeared in various media, including the 1939 film The Wizard of Oz, as well as in various other films and comedy acts.

Concept
While Baum may have written about it, there are no surviving notes for the composition of The Wonderful Wizard of Oz. The lack of this information has resulted in mere speculation of the term origins he used in the book, which include the word Munchkin. The symbol was originally a 13th-century statue of a monk, looking down from the town hall in Munich. Over the years, the image was reproduced many times, for instance as a figure on beer steins, and eventually evolved into a child wearing a pointed hood. Baum's family had German origins, suggesting that Baum could have seen one such reproduction in his childhood. It is also possible that Munchkin came from the German word , which means "mannikin" or "little figure". In 1900, Baum published a book about window displays in which he stressed the importance of mannequins in attracting customers. Another possibility is a connection to Baron Munchausen. This fictional character is based on a real baron who told outrageous tall tales based on his military career. Like the other Oz terms, the word Munchkin ends in a diminutive which in this case refers to the size of the natives.

Literature

Oz Books by Frank Baum

The Munchkins are first mentioned (quote shown) in an excerpt from chapter two of The Wonderful Wizard of Oz, titled "The Council with the Munchkins". Dorothy initially meets only three of them, along with the Good Witch of the North. The rest of the Munchkins then come out of hiding and are shown to be grateful towards Dorothy for killing their evil ruler the Wicked Witch of the East. Dorothy later eventually finds the yellow brick road, and along the way attends a banquet held by a Munchkin man named Boq. Sometime in the book a background story is also given about a "Munchkin maiden" (named Nimmie Amee in later books), who was the former love interest of the Tin Woodman.

Baum also included the Munchkin characters in his later works as minor and major individual characters. The Munchkin Jinjur is the main antagonist in Baum's second book The Marvelous Land of Oz, where she seeks to overthrow the Scarecrow and take over the Emerald City. Jinjur makes a brief appearance in the next book, entitled Ozma of Oz, and is later brought back in Baum's twelfth book, The Tin Woodman of Oz. By this time, she is shown to be a more prominent character who is helpful and friendly to Dorothy and her friends. Two other major Munchkin characters also appear in The Tin Woodman of Oz: Tommy Kwikstep and Nimmie Amee. The former appears in the story asking for a wish for running an errand for a witch; the latter is the name given to the mystery "Munchkin maiden" from the first book, who was the former lover of the Tin Woodman. More information is revealed that tells about the Tin Woodman's origin, and their tragic love story. Lastly, the Munchkin Unc Nunkie appears in Baum's seventh book, The Patchwork Girl of Oz, where he is accidentally turned to stone. His Munchkin nephew Ojo successfully goes on a quest in search of an antidote while learning more about himself in the process.

Subsequent Oz books
L. Frank Baum died on 6 May 1919 after which other writers took up writing additional Oz stories. In some cases these books were written under Baum's name, and include among other characters the Munchkins. There is at least one known Munchkin character that was created after Baum's death that appears as a major character. Zif is a Munchkin boy who appears in John R. Neill's first adaptation called The Royal Book of Oz. Zif is a student at the College of Art and Athletic Perfection; he is both respectful and resentful towards his teacher Wogglebog who considers Zif a "nobody or a nothing." The Munchkin characters that Baum had created in his lifetime also appear in these additional works.

Film and musicals

Early works (1902–1933)
While the 1939 film is the most well known adaptation (see section below), it was not the first outside work to show the Munchkins in film or musical format. One of the first musical adaptations of Baum's books took place in 1902; it was also dubbed The Wizard of Oz. The Munchkins make their appearance in act one, called "The Storm," in which they are shown dancing around their maypole, not noticing that Dorothy's house has fallen to earth killing the Wicked Witch of the East. The first film adaptation of Baum's works, titled The Wonderful Wizard of Oz, was released in 1910, followed by three sequels. However, it wasn't until 1914 that Munchkin characters first appeared in film works. Ojo the Lucky and Unc Nunkie both appear in a film titled The Patchwork Girl of Oz (based on the book of the same name). This film stars American actress Violet MacMillan as Ojo, and was produced by Baum.

1939 film

The 1939 movie musical The Wizard of Oz was loosely based on Baum's novel. Notable differences of the Munchkins include their country name of Munchkinland, and their clothes of many colors instead of an all-blue attire. In the musical, the Munchkins are mostly portrayed by adult actors with dwarfism, but a few average-sized children were also included as background extras.

In the musical, the Munchkins first appear when Dorothy and Toto arrive in the Land of Oz after her house lands on the Wicked Witch of the East. The Munchkins hide from all the commotion until Glinda the Good Witch arrives reassuring them that everything is okay. Dorothy tells them how she arrived in the Land of Oz (through a musical number) and the Munchkins celebrate. To make it official, the Mayor of Munchkinland and his assistant have to make sure that the Wicked Witch of the East is really dead before the celebration continues. The coroner confirms this to the mayor by saying that the witch is "not only merely dead", but is indeed "most sincerely dead" while showing the Certificate of Death. The Munchkins then celebrate further as Dorothy receives gifts from the "Lullaby League" and the "Lollipop Guild." Near the end of the song, the Wicked Witch of the West arrives, which causes the Munchkins to panic. After the Wicked Witch of the West leaves, Glinda tells Dorothy to follow the yellow brick road to the Emerald City as the Munchkins guide her out of Munchkinland.

The Munchkin actors have since not avoided controversy with alleged behavior behind the scenes. In a 1967 interview, Judy Garland referred to all of the Munchkins as "little drunks" who got intoxicated every night to the point where they had to be picked up in "butterfly nets". These accusations were denied as fabrications by fellow Munchkin Margaret Pellegrini, who said only "a couple of kids from Germany even drank beer". On 20 November 2007, the Munchkins were given a star on the Hollywood Walk of Fame. Seven of the surviving Munchkin actors from the film were present. As a result of the popularity of the 1939 film, the word "munchkin" has entered the English language as a reference to small children, persons with dwarfism, or anything of diminutive stature.

Actors and actresses
The following is a list of actors who portrayed the Munchkins in the 1939 film. Most of the dwarfs hired were acquired for MGM by Leo Singer, the proprietor of Singer's Midgets. A Daily Variety news story from 17 August 1938, stated 124 dwarves had been signed to play Munchkins; modern sources place the number either at 122 or 124. An additional dozen or so child actors were hired to make up for the shortage of dwarves. At least one Munchkin actor, Dale Paullin (stage name Paul Dale), did not make the final cut for the movie. Only two actors (Joseph Koziel and Frank Cucksey) used their actual voices for the dialogue exchanged with Dorothy where she is given the flowers. The rest of the voices such as the "Munchkin chorus" were created by studio voices recorded at a slow speed.

In 1989, author Stephen Cox researched, found, and wrote about the surviving Munchkin actors fifty years after they made the film. He wrote about them in his book, The Munchkins Remember (1989, E.P. Dutton) which was later revised as The Munchkins of Oz (Cumberland House), and his book remained in print for nearly two decades. When he wrote the book, 33 of the actors with dwarfism who appeared in the film were still alive and were interviewed. Several of them outlived all the major cast, as well as the original Tin Man Buddy Ebsen. Jerry Maren, who played the green "Lollipop Guild" member, was the last living adult Munchkin actor. Maren was the only Munchkin alive when the film’s longest living cast member, Shep Houghton, an extra, died in 2016.

Notes: Some of the information presented in the table below may never be complete as Social Security records remain sparse prior to the mid-twentieth century. Stage names and/or aliases are present in italics and quotation marks.

Child actresses          
About a dozen children of average height were hired so they could be used for background fill. Sources differ on the number of children used for these roles ranging anywhere from 10 to 12. The names used for the women are maiden names with known aliases present in italics and quotation marks.

, at least four "child munchkins" are known to be living:

Later works (1940–1989)
The 1939 film was adapted into a musical that was released in 1942 that includes the Munchkin characters. The events that take place mirror the film including the song "Ding-Dong! The Witch Is Dead". Twenty-seven years later an animated film called The Wonderful Land of Oz was made; it has Jinjur as a major character.

Other works

 The Munchkins appeared in The Wiz and were played by children and teenagers. (1978)
 The Munchkins appear at the end of Return to Oz. They are seen celebrating Dorothy's return after defeating the Nome King and are present at Princess Ozma's coronation. Tommy Kwikstep was also seen there. (1985)
 In The Muppets' Wizard of Oz, the Munchkins were played by Rizzo the Rat (who portrayed the Mayor of Munchkinland) and his fellow rats. (2005)
 The Munchkins appeared in Dorothy and the Witches of Oz. The Munchkins were first seen in the battle against the Wicked Witch of the West's forces in Oz. They were later brought to Earth by Glinda in order to combat the forces of the Wicked Witch of the West. (2012)
 The Munchkins appear in Oz the Great and Powerful. They alongside the Quadlings and the Tinkers as inhabitants of Glinda's protectorate. Although the film is not otherwise a musical, the Munchkins sing and dance much as they do in the 1939 film. (2013)
 The Munchkins appear in more than one skit on Mad TV where the 1939 film is parodied. The actors are played by people with dwarfism.
 The Munchkins appear in the television series Once Upon a Time. Not much is known about them, but they seem to be similar to the Dwarves in the Enchanted forest as Zelena originally thought that Sneezy was a Munchkin. Also, Regina Mills once mistakenly referred to the Seven Dwarfs as Munchkins.
 The Munchkins appear in Dorothy and the Wizard of Oz with the Mayor of Munchkinland voiced by Bill Fagerbakke and the background Munchkins voiced by Steven Blum and Jessica DiCicco. Ojo, Dr. Pipt, the Lollipop Guild, and the Lullaby League are also featured. Also, Smith & Tinker are depicted as Munchkins in this show.

Notes

References

Oz (franchise) characters
Fictional dwarves
Fictional human races
Literary characters introduced in 1900
Fictional slaves
Male characters in literature
Female characters in literature